Nuna is the second month of the Mandaean calendar. Light fasting is practiced by Mandaeans on the 25th day of Nuna.

It is the Mandaic name for the constellation Pisces. It currently corresponds to Aug / Sep in the Gregorian calendar due to a lack of a leap year in the Mandaean calendar.

References

Months of the Mandaean calendar
Pisces in astrology